A quarter is a section of an urban settlement.

A quarter can be administratively defined and its borders officially designated, and it may have its own administrative structure (subordinate to that of the city, town or other urban area). Such a division is particularly common in countries like  Italy, France, Romania, Georgia (k'vart'ali), 
Bulgaria (Serbia ( / ), Croatia. It may be denoted as a borough (in English-speaking countries), Spain (barrio), Portugal/Brazil; or some other term (e.g. Poland, Germany, and Cambodia ( sangkat).

Quarter can also refer to a non-administrative but distinct neighbourhood with its own character: for example, a slum quarter. It is often used for a district connected with a particular group of people: for instance, some cities are said to have Jewish quarters, diplomatic quarters or Bohemian quarters.

The Old City of Jerusalem currently has four quarters: the Muslim Quarter, Christian Quarter, Jewish Quarter and the Armenian Quarter (it used to have a Moroccan Quarter). A Christian quarter also exists in Damascus.

History
Most ancient Roman cities were divided to four parts, called Quarters, by their two main avenues: the Cardo and the Decumanus Maximus.

See also

Bairro
Barrio
Borough
Township
Municipality
French Quarter
German Quarter
Irish Quarter
Jewellery Quarter
Latin Quarter
European Quarter

References

Urban studies and planning terminology
Types of administrative division